Boruto: Naruto Next Generations is a Japanese anime series based on the manga series of the same name and is a spin-off and sequel to Masashi Kishimoto's Naruto. It is produced by Pierrot and broadcast on TV Tokyo. The anime is directed by Noriyuki Abe (#1–104, #282–286), Hiroyuki Yamashita (#1–66), Toshirō Fujii (#67–104), and Masayuki Kōda (#105–281, #287–) and is written by Makoto Uezu (#1–66) and Masaya Honda (#67–). Former manga writer Ukyō Kodachi supervised the story until episode 216.

Boruto follows the exploits of Naruto Uzumaki's son Boruto and his comrades from the Hidden Leaf Village's ninja academy while finding a path to follow once they grow up. Despite being based on the manga, the anime explores original storylines and adaptations of the spin-off manga, Naruto: The Seventh Hokage and the Scarlet Spring; Boruto: Naruto the Movie; as well as the Naruto Shinden light novel series.

It premiered on TV Tokyo on April 5, 2017, and aired every Wednesday at 5:55 PM JST. Starting May 3, 2018 (episode 56) it aired every Thursday at 7:25 PM JST. Starting October 7, 2018 (episode 76) it now airs every Sunday at 5:30 PM JST. The series is also being released in DVDs. Viz Media licensed the series on March 23, 2017, to simulcast it on Hulu, and on Crunchyroll. On April 21, 2020, it was announced that episode 155 and onward would be delayed due to the ongoing COVID-19 pandemic. After a two-month hiatus, the episode resumed on July 5, 2020. On March 9, 2023, it was announced that the series is set to finish its first part with episode 293 on  March 26, 2023 and a second part was announced to be in development.

In the United States, the English dub made its premiere on Adult Swim's Toonami programming block on September 29, 2018. Adult Swim removed the series from the block's rotation after episode 52 on October 20, 2019. Adult Swim executive Jason DeMarco addressed on Twitter that they currently have no plans to bring the anime back. The same batch of dubbed episodes were additionally broadcast in Australia on ABC Me.

Episode list
NOTE: Boruto: Naruto Next Generations does not feature an official "arc" or "season" sub-listing title on Japanese DVD releases, which was originally the case with both Naruto anime series. For practicality purposes this article has been split into multiple lists, which each representing groups of 52 episodes each. It does not constitute as official means for dividing the Boruto anime series. There are two parts to the series. Part 1 lasting from episodes 1 through 293.

List 1 (2017–18)

List 2 (2018–19)

List 3 (2019–20)

List 4 (2020–21)

List 5 (2021–22)

List 6 (2022–present)

Home media release

Japanese

English

Notes

References

External links
 Boruto: Naruto Next Generations at Crunchyroll
 

Boruto: Naruto Next Generations
Boruto
Boruto: Naruto Next Generations